United Nations Security Council Resolution 188, adopted on April 9, 1964, after a complaint by the Yemen Arab Republic about a British air attack on their territory on March 28, the Council deplored the action at Harib as well as at least 40 other attacks that had occurred in that area. The United Kingdom had also complained that Yemen had violated the airspace of the Federation of South Arabia.

The Council asked the Yemen Arab Republic and the United Kingdom to exercise the maximum restraint in order to avoid future conflict and requested the Secretary-General use his good offices to try to settle the issue with the parties.

The resolution was adopted by nine votes to none, with the United Kingdom and the United States abstaining.

See also
List of United Nations Security Council Resolutions 101 to 200 (1953–1965)

References

External links
 
Text of the Resolution at undocs.org

 0188
North Yemen
 0188
 0188
1964 in North Yemen
1964 in the United Kingdom
United Kingdom–Yemen relations
Federation of South Arabia
April 1964 events